Carlos Alberto Rangel de Andrade (born in Beira, Mozambique), better known as Mingo Rangel, is a Mozambican musician, singer, composer and writer.

Early life 
Born in Mozambique in the city of Beira, Rangel started his classical guitar studies early with professor Alfredo Costa.

He has held a professional musician's licence since 1979, when he was performing compulsory military service at the Military Hospital in Estrela (Lisbon, Portugal).

Music career 
Rangel plays guitar with Portuguese musical group Trio Odemira. He also regularly works with London-based jazz group Grand Union Orchestra, with whom he has performed in Holland, Ireland, France and the United Kingdom.

It was with Grand Union Orchestra that Rangel recorded an album at the famous Queen Elizabeth Hall in London, participated in the Setúbal Music Festival, and played at the Calouste Gulbenkian Foundation.

Rangel provided music for the 1996 film Mississe: a story of love, lust and black magic set in a small village in southern Mozambique.

Some of Rangel's hits have been recorded and performed by renowned names in the Portuguese-speaking music scene, such as Paulo de Carvalho, Dany Silva, Maria João Silveira, Tito Paris, and João Afonso.

, Rangel teaches classical guitar.

Writing 
Rangel has published three books of poetry: Roupa Lavada, Na Ardósia and Receitas de Presépio.

He wrote the play Só Nos Dois, which featured actress Eugenia Bettencourt.

Discography

As performer
 A Trova Lusiada (with Grand Union Orchestra) - The Rhythm of Tides (RedGold Records, 1997)
 Music At Last (with Grand Union Orchestra) - The Rhythm of Tides (RedGold Records, 1997)
 Bocas Bocas (with Lura & João Maria Pinto) - Canções Proibidas: O Cancioneiro Do Niassa (EMI Portugal, 1999)
 Mexe Mexe (with Grand Union Orchestra) - Around The World in 80 Minutes (RedGold Records, 2002)
 Piri Piri (with Grand Union Orchestra) - Around The World in 80 Minutes (RedGold Records, 2002)

As composer
 Assim Mesmo - Todos Diferentes, Todos Iguais by Paulo De Carvalho - Os Meninos De Huambo (EMI Portugal, 1997)
 Dança Do Mexe, Mexe by Chave D’Ouro - Pai da Criança (Espacial, 2010)
 Há Samba Nas Colinas De Lisboa by Carla Pires - Queens of Fado: The Next Generation (Arc Music, 2017)

References 

Year of birth missing (living people)
Living people
20th-century Mozambican male singers
21st-century Mozambican male singers